Drumcondra House is a Georgian house and gardens in Drumcondra, Dublin, Ireland which as of 2022 forms part of the DCU All Hallows Campus and formerly part of All Hallows College. It was designed by the architects Sir Edward Lovett Pearce and Alessandro Galilei and was built in 1726 for Marmaduke Coghill who had originally lived in Belvidere House, and now forms part of DCU St. Patrick's Campus Drumcondra.

History 
Coghill moved into Drumcondra House where he lived with his sister Mary until his death; the house was renowned for its gardens. 

Close by Drumcondra Church (formerly Clonturk parish) was built by Mark Coghill and contains a statue to her brother Marmaduke, on her death, the house was left to their niece.

Drumcondra House became the residence of Charles Moore, then second Lord Tullamore, and afterwards Earl of Charleville, who was married to a Coghill niece who following Moore's death remarried a second husband Major John Mayne, who assumed the name of Coghill, and was created a baronet.

It was leased the Countess of Charleville to Alderman Alexander Kirkpatrick of Dublin Corporation a former high sheriff. Insurgents from the United Irishmen's 1798 rebellion were supposedly hung from a tree in the grounds of Drumcondra House. 

The soldier Major General Sir Guy Campbell K.C.B. was the last resident in the House, who rented it from the Coghill family.

In 1842 Drumcondra House was rented by a Catholic priest named Father John Hand  who went on to found a seminary All Hallows College there, which was run by the Vincentian order which is now a college of Dublin City University.

Building 
The main house is an eleven-bay three-storey building and appears to have been built around 1710 by Edward Lovett Pearce with a further ornate south facade added by Allesandro Gallilei in around 1726. The later elements include the striking Portland stone features including corinthian pilasters and platband which contrast with other darker calp stone used in construction.

Temple 
A temple in the grounds of the house was also designed by Alessandro Galilei and was constructed around 1720.

References 

Drumcondra, Dublin
Houses in the Republic of Ireland
Edward Lovett Pearce buildings
Dublin City University
All Hallows College, Dublin
Alessandro Galilei buildings